In Ohio, State Route 234 may refer to:
Ohio State Route 234 (1920s), now part of SR 93
Ohio State Route 234 (1930s), now part of SR 60 and SR 754